World Peace Through World Law was a book by Louis B. Sohn and Grenville Clark in 1958 that proposed a Revised United Nations Charter. Some of their suggestions included the following: 

Allocating votes in the UN General Assembly based on the populations of member nations;
Replacing the UN Security Council with an Executive Council with China, India, USSR, and the U.S. as permanent members, and no veto power; and
Making a World Police Force that would become the only military force permitted in the world.

Cultural references

In one passage of Rex Stout's 1959 detective novel Champagne for One, the character Nero Wolfe is described as sitting behind his desk reading World Peace Through World Law. Wolfe is greatly impressed with the book, to the point of forgetting the current mystery he is involved in solving, and suggests to his colleague Archie Goodwin that he must read it too (ch. VII).

External links

 

World government
United Nations mass media
United Nations reform
1958 non-fiction books